Bér is a village and municipality in the comitat of Nógrád, Hungary. The village is the part of the Novohrad-Nógrád Geopark.

References

Links 
 Novohrad-Nógrád UNESCO Global Geopark

Populated places in Nógrád County
Novohrad-Nógrád UNESCO Global Geopark